In geometry, a 10-demicube or demidekeract is a uniform 10-polytope, constructed from the 10-cube with alternated vertices removed. It is part of a dimensionally infinite family of uniform polytopes called demihypercubes.

E. L. Elte identified it in 1912 as a semiregular polytope, labeling it as HM10 for a ten-dimensional half measure polytope.

Coxeter named this polytope as 171 from its Coxeter diagram, with a ring on one of the 1-length branches,  and Schläfli symbol  or {3,37,1}.

Cartesian coordinates 
Cartesian coordinates for the vertices of a demidekeract centered at the origin are alternate halves of the dekeract:
 (±1,±1,±1,±1,±1,±1,±1,±1,±1,±1)
with an odd number of plus signs.

Images

References 
 H.S.M. Coxeter: 
 Coxeter, Regular Polytopes, (3rd edition, 1973), Dover edition, p.296, Table I (iii): Regular Polytopes, three regular polytopes in n-dimensions (n≥5)
 H.S.M. Coxeter, Regular Polytopes, 3rd Edition, Dover New York, 1973, p.296, Table I (iii): Regular Polytopes, three regular polytopes in n-dimensions (n≥5)
 Kaleidoscopes: Selected Writings of H.S.M. Coxeter, edited by F. Arthur Sherk, Peter McMullen, Anthony C. Thompson, Asia Ivic Weiss, Wiley-Interscience Publication, 1995,  
 (Paper 22) H.S.M. Coxeter, Regular and Semi Regular Polytopes I, [Math. Zeit. 46 (1940) 380-407, MR 2,10]
 (Paper 23) H.S.M. Coxeter, Regular and Semi-Regular Polytopes II, [Math. Zeit. 188 (1985) 559-591]
 (Paper 24) H.S.M. Coxeter, Regular and Semi-Regular Polytopes III, [Math. Zeit. 200 (1988) 3-45]
 John H. Conway, Heidi Burgiel, Chaim Goodman-Strass, The Symmetries of Things 2008,  (Chapter 26. pp. 409: Hemicubes: 1n1)
 Norman Johnson Uniform Polytopes, Manuscript (1991)
 N.W. Johnson: The Theory of Uniform Polytopes and Honeycombs, Ph.D. (1966)

External links 

 Multi-dimensional Glossary

10-polytopes